Göran Hälsinges Gränd (Swedish: "Alley of Göran Hälsinge") is an alley in Gamla stan, the old town in central Stockholm, Sweden. Connecting Västerlånggatan to Stora Nygatan, it forms a parallel street to Helga Lekamens Gränd and Ignatiigränd.

History
The alley is named after a man without renown, Göran Hälsinge, son to Nils Hälsinge and Appolonia Larsdotter.  When King Eric XIV's (1533–1577) was still two years old, his mother, the first consort of King Gustav Vasa Catherine of Saxe-Lauenburg (1513–1535), died unexpectedly, and as Appolonia assisted the royal family as wet nurse she was rewarded a house in the alley, later named after her son.  The alley is mentioned as Niels Helsingz grend in 1584, and as Jörenn Helssingz grendh in 1588, but was probably commonly referred to as simply Helsingz grenden (1553).

In his 31st epistle, the troubadour Carl Michael Bellman (1740–1795) gives a hint the alley was associated with prostitution:

See also 
 List of streets and squares in Gamla stan

References

External links 
 
 hitta.se - Location map and virtual walk

Streets in Stockholm